The smoky pocket gopher (Cratogeomys fumosus) is a species of rodent in the family Geomyidae. It is endemic to Mexico (Querétaro). Its natural habitat is subtropical or tropical dry lowland grassland. Molecular phylogenetics has revealed that this species also includes the animals formerly separated as C. gymnurus, C. neglectus, C. tylorhinus and C. zinseri.

Sources

Cratogeomys
Endemic mammals of Mexico
Natural history of Querétaro
Endangered biota of Mexico
Mammals described in 1892
Taxonomy articles created by Polbot